Malkohas are large birds in the cuckoo  family Cuculidae. The group name is derived from the Sinhala word for the red-faced malkoha;  meaning flower-cuckoo. These are all tropical species.

Cuculidae